Vincent Thabiso Jobo (born 1 February 1991 in Krugersdorp, South Africa) is a South African rugby union player, currently playing with American Major League Rugby side New Orleans Gold. His regular position is flanker or number eight.

Career

Golden Lions / UJ

He joined their academy and played for the  side in the 2010 Under-19 Provincial Championship and was named in the  squad for the 2011 Under-21 Provincial Championship, but did not play in any matches. He was also named in the  squad for the 2012 Varsity Cup competition, but failed to make any appearances.

Western Province / UCT Ikey Tigers

During 2012, Jobo moved to Cape Town where he joined .

He made his first class debut for  during the 2013 Vodacom Cup, playing off the bench in their match against  in Ceres, helping them to come from behind to salvage a 17–17 draw.

He played in eight matches for Ikeys during the competition, scoring a try against  as he helped the side reach the final. He also featured in the final against  in Potchefstroom, where UCT fought back from 33–15 down with five minutes to go to score a 39–33 victory.

Free State Cheetahs

References

1991 births
Living people
Expatriate rugby union players in the United States
Free State Cheetahs players
New Orleans Gold players
People from Krugersdorp
Rugby union flankers
Rugby union number eights
South African expatriate rugby union players
South African expatriate sportspeople in the United States
Western Province (rugby union) players
Rugby union players from Gauteng